The 2022 Interwetten Austrian Darts Open was the fourth of thirteen PDC European Tour events on the 2022 PDC Pro Tour. The tournament was held at the Steiermarkhalle, Premstätten from 29 April to 1 May 2022. It featured a field of 48 players and £140,000 in prize money, with £25,000 going to the winner.

Michael van Gerwen entered the event as the defending champion, having defeated Ian White 8–7 in the 2019 final. He successfully defended his title with an 8–5 win over Danny Noppert in the final.

Prize money
The prize money is unchanged from the European Tours of the last 3 years:

 Seeded players who lose in the second round and host nation qualifiers (who qualify automatically as a result of their ranking) who lose in their first match of the event shall not be credited with prize money on any Order of Merit. A player who qualifies as a qualifier, but later becomes a seed due to the withdrawal of one or more other players shall be credited with their prize money on all Orders of Merit regardless of how far they progress in the event.

Qualification and format
The top 16 entrants from the PDC ProTour Order of Merit on 16 March automatically qualified for the event and were seeded in the second round.

The remaining 32 places went to players from six qualifying events – 24 from the Tour Card Holder Qualifier (held on 18 March), two from the Associate Member Qualifier (held on 24 April), the two highest ProTour ranking Austrian players, two from the Host Nation Qualifier (held on 28 April), one from the Nordic & Baltic Associate Member Qualifier (held on 18 February), and one from the East European Associate Member Qualifier (held on 6 March).

Top seed Gerwyn Price and qualifier Adrian Lewis withdrew before the start of the tournament, so Ross Smith was promoted into the seeded positions and two extra places were made available in the Host Nation Qualifier. 

The following players took part in the tournament:

Top 16
  (second round)
  (second round)
  (quarter-finals)
  (champion)
  (second round)
  (second round)
  (second round)
  (second round)
  (quarter-finals)
  (second round)
  (third round)
  (quarter-finals)
  (third round)
  (third round)
  (semi-finals)
  (second round)

Tour Card Qualifier
  (first round)
  (first round)
  (first round)
  (second round)
  (third round)
  (semi-finals)
  (first round)
  (second round)
  (third round)
  (first round)
  (second round)
  (third round)
  (second round)
  (first round)
  (first round)
  (runner-up)
  (second round)
  (third round)
  (first round)
  (second round)
  (first round)
  (quarter-finals)

Associate Member Qualifier
  (second round)
  (first round)

Highest Ranked Austrians
  (first round)
  (third round)

Host Nation Qualifier
  (second round)
  (first round)
  (first round)
  (first round)

Nordic & Baltic Qualifier
  (first round)

East European Qualifier
  (first round)

Draw

Notes

References

2022 PDC Pro Tour
2022 PDC European Tour
2022 in Austrian sport
April 2022 sports events in Austria
May 2022 sports events in Austria